"Touch" is a song by American singer Amerie from her second studio album of the same name (2005). Written by Amerie, Lil Jon, Sean Garrett, Craig Love, LRoc, and LaMarquis Jefferson and produced by Lil Jon, the track was released on May 31, 2005, as the album's second single. While "Touch" reached the top 20 in the United Kingdom and Ireland and number 33 in Australia, it failed to match the success of "1 Thing" in the United States, missing the Billboard Hot 100 and reaching number 95 on the Billboard Hot R&B/Hip-Hop Songs chart.

Track listings
 UK CD 1
 "Touch" (album version) – 3:38
 "Touch" (Partners In Rhyme Mix featuring T.I.) – 3:59
 "Touch" (The Milk Bros Remix featuring T.I.) – 7:51
 "Touch" (instrumental) – 3:31
 "Touch" (video)

 UK CD 2
 "Touch" (album version) – 3:38
 "Touch" (Remix featuring T.I.) – 3:23
 "Touch" (Touch This Remix)
 "Touch" (Touch This Remix radio edit)
 "Touch" (video)

 US 12-inch single
A1. "Touch" (remix featuring T.I.) – 3:23
A2. "Touch" (remix a capella featuring T.I.) – 3:21
B1. "Touch" (instrumental) – 3:31
B2. "Touch" (album version) – 3:38

 US digital single
 "Touch" (album version) – 3:38
 "Touch" (remix featuring T.I.)

Charts

Release history

References

2005 singles
2005 songs
Amerie songs
Columbia Records singles
Music videos directed by Chris Robinson (director)
Song recordings produced by Lil Jon
Songs written by Amerie
Songs written by Craig Love
Songs written by Lil Jon
Songs written by LRoc
Songs written by Sean Garrett
T.I. songs